Four ships of the French Navy have borne the name Amiral Charner in honour of admiral Léonard Charner:

 , an armoured cruiser
 Amiral Charner, an auxiliary cruiser, sunk by U-41
 , a 
 , a 

French Navy ship names